Dennis Eilhoff (born 31 July 1982) is a German former professional footballer who played as a football goalkeeper.

Career

Youth
Born in Witten, West Germany, Eilhoff began his career with SC Delbrück in 1990. Four years later he played for TuS Paderborn-Neuhaus, the present SC Paderborn 07. In 1996, Eilhoff moved to Arminia Bielefeld.

During his youth he belonged to the German national under-17 team.

Club career
Starting in 2000, Eilhoff was in the squad of Arminia Bielefeld. His first appearances were in the 2000–01 season of the 2. Bundesliga.
He could never stand out against the regular goalkeeper Mathias Hain with the result that he only came to four matches in all before 2006 including two matches in the 2005–06 season of the Bundesliga. In the 2006–07 season, he was loaned out to TuS Koblenz for two years in the 2. Bundesliga. Starting in the 2006–07 season, he was the regular goalkeeper where he passed every match except one.
In the 2008–09 season, he returned to Arminia Bielefeld. Due to injury of the first goalkeeper Rowen Fernandez, Eilhoff could play for the most part in the first half of this season. By his performance he stayed first choice despite the convalescence of Fernandez. On this account he renewed his contract with Arminia in February 2009 until 2011. Even after the relegation to the 2. Bundesliga he stayed loyal to his club.

In June 2011, Eilhoff left Arminia Bielefeld and signed a one-year-contract with Dynamo Dresden, where he made his debut on 15 July 2011 against Energie Cottbus. He was released by Dynamo after one season.

Personal
Eilhoff completed his Abitur at the Nepomucenum Gymnasium of Rietberg in 2001. Since his retirement from professional football, Eilhoff works as a police officer.

References

External links
 
 

1982 births
Living people
German footballers
Association football goalkeepers
Dynamo Dresden players
Arminia Bielefeld players
TuS Koblenz players
Bundesliga players
2. Bundesliga players
People from Witten
Sportspeople from Arnsberg (region)
Footballers from North Rhine-Westphalia